In optics, an optical medium is material through which light and other electromagnetic waves propagate.  It is a form of transmission medium.  The permittivity and permeability of the medium define how electromagnetic waves propagate in it.

Properties
The optical medium has an intrinsic impedance, given by

In a region with no electrical conductivity, the expression simplifies to:

For example, in free space the intrinsic impedance is called the characteristic impedance of vacuum, denoted Z0, and

This equation also may be put in the form

The propagation velocity of electromagnetic waves in free space, an idealized standard reference state (like absolute zero for temperature), is conventionally denoted by c0: 

For a general introduction, see Serway For a discussion of synthetic media, see Joannopoulus.

Types

 Homogeneous medium vs. heterogeneous medium
 Transparent medium vs. opaque body
 Translucent medium

See also
Čerenkov radiation
Electromagnetic spectrum
Electromagnetic radiation
Optics
SI units
Free space
Metamaterial
Photonic crystal
Photonic crystal fiber

Notes and references

Optics
Electric and magnetic fields in matter